Mollakənd (also, Mollakend) is a village in the Lankaran Rayon of Azerbaijan.  The village forms part of the municipality of Rvo.

References 

Populated places in Lankaran District